Mogens Haastrup (born 28 June 1939) is a Danish former amateur football (soccer) player, who played for Svendborg fB and B 1909 in Denmark. He was the top goalscorer of the 1963 Danish football championship. He played two games for the Denmark national football team.

References

External links
Danish national team profile

1939 births
Living people
Danish men's footballers
Association football forwards
Place of birth missing (living people)